Rio Rancho Events Center is a 8,000-seat multi-purpose arena in Rio Rancho, New Mexico, a city located near Albuquerque. The arena is located near the intersection of Unser Boulevard and Paseo del Volcan. It is part of a larger "City Center" project, which also includes a new city hall.  The multipurpose facility can host concert settings in various capacities, hockey, basketball, indoor football, family shows, rodeos, trade shows and flexible set-ups to accommodate any event.

Santa Ana Star Casino purchased the naming rights to the arena in a five-year, $2.5 million deal signed in July 2006. The arena was previously known as Santa Ana Star Center. The contract was not renewed in 2020, resulting in the arena changing its name back to Rio Rancho Events Center.

The arena was completed at a cost of $47 million USD and opened on October 21, 2006. The first sports event in the arena was a hockey game on October 27, 2006, with the New Mexico Scorpions falling to the Arizona Sundogs 3–1 in front of a sellout crowd.

In April 2009, the city of Rio Rancho awarded Global Spectrum as the management company for the Arena.  In 2019, that contract was renewed.

The Events Center is currently home to the New Mexico Runners of the Major Arena Soccer League 2 and the Duke City Gladiators of the Indoor Football League.  The center was formerly home to the New Mexico Mustangs of the North American Hockey League, the New Mexico Scorpions of the Central Hockey League, the New Mexico Stars of the Indoor Football League/Lone Star Football League, the New Mexico Wildcats of the American Indoor Football Association, New Mexico Thunderbirds, of the NBA Development League, and a venue for World Wrestling Entertainment. The arena also hosted a campaign rally for President Donald Trump on September 16, 2019.

References

 Olson, Sean (October 22, 2006). "A Star Is Born." Albuquerque Journal.
 Yodice, James (October 28, 2006). "Scorpions Lose to Sundogs at New Home." Albuquerque Journal.
 Yodice, James (July 14, 2006). "Naming Rights Go For $2.5M." Albuquerque Journal.

External links
Rio Rancho Events Center Website

Rio Rancho, New Mexico
Basketball venues in New Mexico
Defunct NBA G League venues
Indoor arenas in New Mexico
Indoor ice hockey venues in the United States
Indoor soccer venues
Soccer venues in New Mexico
New Mexico Thunderbirds
Buildings and structures in Sandoval County, New Mexico
Tourist attractions in Sandoval County, New Mexico
Music venues in New Mexico
Sports venues completed in 2006
2006 establishments in New Mexico